The city of Poplar Bluff, Missouri, is the third-most populous city in Missouri's 8th congressional district and southeastern Missouri.

The town was started in 1850.  The city was incorporated on February 9, 1870.

List of mayors

References
Missouri Secretary of State official manuals

Key

Poplar Bluff
People from Poplar Bluff, Missouri